Ubay may refer to:
Ubay (name), a given name
Ubay, Bohol, Philippines
Ubay Airport
Ubay Poblacion, barangay in the municipality of Ubay

See also
 Ubaye, a river of southeastern France
 Ubaye Valley